The 1985 South Australian Open was a men's Grand Prix tennis tournament held in Adelaide, Australia. It was held on outdoor grass courts. The tournament was held from 16 December through 22 December. Unseeded qualifier Eddie Edwards won the singles title.

Finals

Singles

 Eddie Edwards defeated  Peter Doohan 6–2, 6–4
 It was Edwards' only singles title of the year.

Doubles

 Mark Edmondson /  Kim Warwick defeated  Nelson Aerts /  Tomm Warneke 6–4, 6–4

References

External links
 ITF tournament edition details

 
South Australian Open
South Australian Open
South Australian Open, 1985
South Australian Open